The Meat & Oil EP is a studio EP by American hip hop producer Jel. It was released on Mush Records in 2002.

Track listing

References

External links
 
 The Meat & Oil EP on Mush Records

Mush Records albums
Instrumental hip hop EPs
2002 EPs